Ectaga lenta is a moth in the family Depressariidae. It was described by Clarke in 1956. It is found in Argentina.

References

Moths described in 1956
Ectaga